Levent Yılmaz (born 20 January 1990) is a Turkish professional footballer who currently plays as a midfielder for Erzincan Refahiyespor.

References

1990 births
Living people
Turkish footballers
Kardemir Karabükspor footballers
Hatayspor footballers
Bayrampaşaspor footballers
Ünyespor footballers
24 Erzincanspor footballers
Süper Lig players
People from Karabük
Association football midfielders